Hüttau is a municipality in the St. Johann im Pongau district in the Austrian state of Salzburg.

Geography
Hüttau lies in the Fritz valley in the Pongau.

References

External links
Information on Hüttau

Gallery 

Cities and towns in St. Johann im Pongau District
Salzburg Slate Alps